Im Jeong-bin (born 18 May 1973) is a South Korean boxer. He competed in the men's middleweight event at the 2000 Summer Olympics.

References

1973 births
Living people
South Korean male boxers
Olympic boxers of South Korea
Boxers at the 2000 Summer Olympics
Place of birth missing (living people)
Asian Games medalists in boxing
Boxers at the 1998 Asian Games
Asian Games silver medalists for South Korea
Medalists at the 1998 Asian Games
Middleweight boxers